UFC 68: The Uprising was a mixed martial arts event held by the Ultimate Fighting Championship on March 3, 2007, at the Nationwide Arena in Columbus, Ohio.

Background
UFC 68 was the first UFC event held in the state of Ohio, and coincided with the 2007 Arnold Sports Festival. The sold-out event produced the highest verifiable live attendance to date for a mixed martial arts event in North America with 19,079 spectators. At the time it was the largest attendance for a MMA event in the United States.

In the main event, UFC Heavyweight Champion Tim Sylvia was set to defend his title against Randy Couture, who was coming out of a 12-month retirement. Couture, a former UFC Heavyweight and Light Heavyweight Champion, hadn't fought as a heavyweight since UFC 39 in 2002.

Also featured at UFC 68 were the return bouts of former champions Matt Hughes at welterweight and Rich Franklin at middleweight.

Results

Bonus awards

Fight of the Night:  Jason Lambert vs. Renato Sobral
Knockout of the Night: Jason Lambert
Submission of the Night: Martin Kampmann

See also
 Ultimate Fighting Championship
 List of UFC champions
 List of UFC events
 2007 in UFC

References

External links

UFC 68 Results on Sherdog.com
Official UFC 68 website
Official UFC 68 Fight Card

Ultimate Fighting Championship events
2007 in mixed martial arts
Mixed martial arts in Ohio
2007 in sports in Ohio
Sports competitions in Columbus, Ohio
Events in Columbus, Ohio